Uranium tetrabromide is an inorganic chemical compound of uranium in oxidation state +4.

Production
Uranium tetrabromide can be produced by reacting uranium and bromine:

U+ 2 Br2 → UBr4

References

Uranium(IV) compounds
Bromides
Actinide halides